Guinea-Bissau Olympic Committee (IOC code: GBS) is the National Olympic Committee representing Guinea-Bissau.

See also
 Guinea-Bissau at the Olympics

References

Guinea-Bissau
Guinea-Bissau at the Olympics